Siroco (S-72) was an  built for the Spanish Navy by Bazán at Cartagena, Spain. The submarine was launched on December 12, 1982, commissioned on December 7, 1983. Because of the economic crisis, the government didn't authorize the reparations of the submarine and was decommissioned on June 29, 2012.

History
Siroco was ordered by a ministerial order and on a proposal of the Office of the Chief of the Navy Staff in 1974 along with other Agosta class submarine,  Galerna (S-71). The construction of the ships took place on Cartagena, Spain.

On June 13, 1985, the submarine was in Cartagena's waters in a practice exercises and the only ship near was a Spanish destroyer  Almirante Valdés. The two ships collided at 8.52 am. This event alarmed the destroyer who ordered to be prepared to fight.

On June 2, 2010 the S-72 was quoted in some Spanish press and radio, for photos taken of a merchant with suspect military equipment off the coast of Syria. It was a NATO Active Endeavor mission held in early March of that year.

In May 2012, the cuts by the central government over the economic crisis made it impossible to invest at least €25 million in a contract with the shipyard of Navantia in Cartagena that had been postponed during the last two years and finale, the ship was decommissioned.

After the decommission, the Spanish Navy tried to sell the submarine to other navies like the Turkish or Thai Navy. After no one bought the submarine, it was scrapped.

See also
 Agosta class
 Submarines of the Spanish Navy

Ships of the class
 Galerna (S-71)
 Mistral (S-73)
 Tramontana (S-74)

Similar ships
 Daphné-class submarine

References

Agosta-class submarines of the Spanish Navy
Ships built in Cartagena, Spain
Submarines of the Spanish Navy
1982 ships
Submarines of Spain